Alcombe may refer to two places in England:

 Alcombe, Somerset, a suburb of Minehead, Somerset
 Alcombe, Wiltshire, a hamlet in the parish of Box, Wiltshire